Pyromania is the third studio album by English rock band Def Leppard, released on 20 January 1983 through Vertigo Records in UK and Europe and through Mercury Records in the US. The first album to feature guitarist Phil Collen who replaced founding member Pete Willis, Pyromania was produced by Robert John "Mutt" Lange. The album was a shift away from the band's traditional heavy metal roots toward a more radio-friendly sound, finding massive mainstream success. Pyromania charted at No. 2 on the Billboard 200, No. 4 on the  Canadian RPM Album chart and No. 18 on the UK Albums Chart. Selling over ten million copies in the US, it has been certified diamond by the RIAA.

Recording
The album was partially recorded with original guitarist Pete Willis, whose rhythm guitar tracks appear on all songs. Toward the end of the recording, Willis was fired for alcohol abuse and replaced by guitarist Phil Collen, who contributed solos and guitar parts not yet recorded by Willis. "I had all the fun stuff, none of the heavy lifting…" Collen remembered. "Pete and Steve [Clark] had done these amazing rhythm guitar beds, and it was a joy to whizz around and play solos over the top… Mutt [Lange] was going, 'Just have fun: be a lead guitarist, go nuts." On the original LP release, Willis is visible in the background of the photograph of singer Joe Elliott, while Collen has his own photo as a new full-time member.

The album can be seen as a transitional one between the heavy metal sound of Leppard's first two albums and the radio-friendly direction of later releases. It featured rockers such as "Rock! Rock! (Till You Drop)", "Stagefright" and "Die Hard the Hunter" as well as the Top 40 hits "Photograph", "Rock of Ages" and "Foolin'".

Reception and legacy

Pyromania has received mostly positive reviews, being commonly considered, along with its follow-up, Hysteria, one of the band's finest efforts to date, and one of "Mutt" Lange's best productions. David Fricke of Rolling Stone praised Leppard for putting "much-needed fire back on the radio", producing sophisticated music "more emotionally charged than most of the synthesized disco that passes for 'modern music'" over the airwaves; adding that the band "may not be highly original, but they mean what they play" and "Lange's artfully busy mix" easily covers up any fault. AllMusic reviewer Steve Huey stated that Pyromania was "where the band's vision coalesced and gelled into something more." He described the songs as "driven by catchy, shiny melodic hooks instead of heavy guitar riffs, although the latter do pop up once in a while", and added that "transcendent hard rock perfection on Pyromania was surprisingly successful; their reach never exceeded their grasp, which makes the album an enduring (and massively influential) classic." Sputnikmusic staff reviewer, equally enthusiastic, thoroughly recommended the album, "filled with tight musicianship, infectious melodies and anthemic choruses" "to pretty much anyone… No matter what their taste in music is."

In contrast, Canadian journalist Martin Popoff considers Pyromania the beginning of Leppard's "creative degeneration" and criticizes Lange's "painstaking approach to detail" that strips the album "of its sweat and grit", making it sound "phony".

"I remember meeting Phil Lynott…" recalled Joe Elliott. "We'd delivered Pyromania and, with us sharing a label with Lizzy, he'd heard it. He put his hand on my shoulder and said, 'I heard your album – it's the reason I've split the band. I can't compete with that.' The crappiest backhand compliment I've ever had. I wish I had been brave enough to shove him up against the wall and say, 'Well, make a better album then!' But I just said, 'Oh,' and scuttled off."

With its melodic hooks and heavy MTV exposure, Pyromania became a massive success, and was a major catalyst for the 1980s pop-metal movement. The album sold six million copies in the US in its original release (about 100,000 copies per week for much of the year). It has since sold over ten million there and been certified diamond. In 1989, it was re-released by audio fidelity company Mobile Fidelity Sound Labs as part of their Ultradisc series.

"Photograph", "Rock of Ages" and "Foolin'" became top 40 singles on the Billboard Hot 100 in the US, with "Photograph" peaking at No. 13 and "Rock of Ages" at No. 16.  "Photograph" (6 weeks) and "Rock of Ages" (1 week) both topped the Billboard Top Rock Tracks while "Foolin'" and "Too Late for Love" made the Top 10. "Comin' Under Fire", "Billy's Got a Gun" and "Action! Not Words" made the top 40 of the Top Rock Tracks chart.

In Canada, "Rock of Ages" charted highest at No. 24, while "Photograph" and "Foolin'" reached No. 32 and No. 39, respectively. At CHUM-AM in Toronto, one of Canada's largest audience Top 40 stations at the time, "Rock of Ages" never reached its Top 30 countdown; whereas 70 km away in Hamilton, at the CKOC-AM Top 40 radio station, it peaked at No. 2.  It also topped the chart at many album-oriented rock stations such as Q107 in Toronto.  "Rock of Ages" also charted the highest in the UK at No. 41 compared to No. 66 for "Photograph".

In 2004, the album was ranked No. 384 on Rolling Stone's 500 Greatest Albums of All Time. In 2006, Q magazine placed the album at No. 35 in its list of "40 Best Albums of the '80s". In 2015, Rolling Stone ranked Pyromania at No. 17 among the 50 Greatest Hair Metal Albums of All Time, and in 2017, the same magazine listed the album at No. 52 on its list of the 100 Greatest Metal Albums of All Time.

Track listing

Original release

"Comin' Under Fire" and "Action! Not Words" are listed inversely on the original Mercury vinyl release, but play in the order above.
The last 56 seconds of track 10 following "Billy's Got a Gun" is a hidden track named "The March of the Wooden Zombies".

2009 deluxe edition bonus disc

Personnel

Def Leppard
Joe Elliott – lead vocals
Phil Collen – guitar solos on 1–3, 6 & 7, backing vocals
Steve Clark – lead and rhythm guitars, backing vocals
Pete Willis – rhythm guitars (all tracks)
Rick Savage – bass, backing vocals
Rick Allen – drums, backing vocals

Additional musicians
"The Leppardettes" – backing vocals
John Kongos – Fairlight CMI programming
Thomas Dolby – keyboard (credited as Booker T. Boffin)
Tony Kaye – additional keyboards (uncredited)

Production
Robert John "Mutt" Lange – producer, mixing
Nigel Green – mixing (uncredited)
Mike Shipley – engineer
Brian "Chuck" New – assistant engineer (Battery Studios)
Craig "Too Loud for Boys" Thomson – assistant engineer (Park Gate Studios)
Bob Ludwig – mastering
Bernard Gudynas – front cover illustration
David Landslide – back cover photograph
Satori – album sleeve concept and design

Charts

Album

Singles

Certifications

Catalog numbers
USA: Mercury Records 810-308-1/2/4
USA/JAPAN: Mobile Fidelity Sound Labs UDCD 520 (Mobile Fidelity Ultradisc Reissue)
UK: Vertigo Records  6359 119 [LP]/7150 119 [Cassette]/810-308-2 [CD]
USA: Mercury Records/Island Records/UMe B0012491-02 (Eco Friendly packaging of Mercury Records 810-308-2)

See also
List of best-selling albums in the United States
List of glam metal albums and songs

References

Def Leppard albums
1983 albums
Mercury Records albums
Vertigo Records albums
Albums produced by Robert John "Mutt" Lange
Albums recorded at Morgan Sound Studios